The 1978 CFL season is considered to be the 25th season in modern-day Canadian football, although it is officially the 21st Canadian Football League season.

The league drew 2,229,834 fans to its 72 regular season games, a record that would stand until the 2005 season by which time the league had extended its schedule from 16 to 18 games. The league's average attendance of 31,831 spectators per game remains a league record as of 2015.

Regular season standings

Final regular season standings
Note: GP = Games Played, W = Wins, L = Losses, T = Ties, PF = Points For, PA = Points Against, Pts = Points

Bold text means that they have clinched the playoffs..
Edmonton and Ottawa have first round byes.

Grey Cup playoffs

The Edmonton Eskimos are the 1978 Grey Cup champions, defeating the Montreal Alouettes, 20–13, at Toronto's Exhibition Stadium. This was the fourth championship meeting between Edmonton and Montreal within the last six years. The Eskimos' Tom Wilkinson (QB) was named the Grey Cup's Most Valuable Player on Offence and Dave "Dr. Death" Fennell (DT) was named the Grey Cup's Most Valuable Player on Defence. While Angelo Santucci (RB) was named Grey Cup's Most Valuable Canadian.

Playoff bracket

CFL Leaders
 CFL Passing Leaders
 CFL Rushing Leaders
 CFL Receiving Leaders

1978 CFL All-Stars

Offence
QB – Tom Wilkinson, Edmonton Eskimos
RB – James Sykes, Calgary Stampeders
RB – Mike Strickland, Saskatchewan Roughriders
SB – Tom Scott, Edmonton Eskimos
TE – Tony Gabriel, Ottawa Rough Riders
WR – Joe Poplawski, Winnipeg Blue Bombers
WR – Bob Gaddis, Montreal Alouettes
C – Al Wilson, BC Lions
OG – Harold Holton, Calgary Stampeders
OG – Bill Stevenson, Edmonton Eskimos
OT – Jim Coode, Ottawa Rough Riders
OT – Dan Yochum, Montreal Alouettes

Defence
DT – Dave Fennell, Edmonton Eskimos
DT – John Helton, Calgary Stampeders
DE – Mike Fanucci, Ottawa Rough Riders
DE – Reggie Lewis, Calgary Stampeders
LB – Danny Kepley, Edmonton Eskimos
LB – Ben Zambiasi, Hamilton Tiger-Cats
LB – Chuck Zapiec, Montreal Alouettes
DB – Joe Hollimon, Edmonton Eskimos
DB – Dickie Harris, Montreal Alouettes
DB – Larry Brune, Ottawa Rough Riders
DB – Gregg Butler, Edmonton Eskimos
DB – Randy Rhino, Montreal Alouettes

Special teams
P – Hank Ilesic, Edmonton Eskimos
K – Dave Cutler, Edmonton Eskimos

1978 Eastern All-Stars

Offence
QB – Condredge Holloway, Ottawa Rough Riders
RB – Jimmy Edwards, Hamilton Tiger-Cats
RB – Mike Murphy, Ottawa Rough Riders
SB – Art Green, Ottawa Rough Riders
WR – Bob Gaddis, Montreal Alouettes
TE – Tony Gabriel, Ottawa Rough Riders
WR – Jeff Avery, Ottawa Rough Riders
C – Donn Smith, Ottawa Rough Riders
OG – Charlie Brandon, Ottawa Rough Riders
OG – Larry Butler, Hamilton Tiger-Cats
OT – Jim Coode, Ottawa Rough Riders
OT – Dan Yochum, Montreal Alouettes

Defence
DT – Glen Weir, Montreal Alouettes
DT – Mike Raines, Ottawa Rough Riders
DE – Mike Fanucci, Ottawa Rough Riders
DE – Jim Corrigall, Toronto Argonauts
LB – Carl Crennell, Montreal Alouettes
LB – Ben Zambiasi, Hamilton Tiger-Cats
LB – Chuck Zapiec, Montreal Alouettes
DB – Eric Harris, Toronto Argonauts
DB – Dickie Harris, Montreal Alouettes
DB – Larry Brune, Ottawa Rough Riders
DB – Jim Burrow, Montreal Alouettes
DB – Randy Rhino, Montreal Alouettes

Special teams
P – Ken Clark, Toronto Argonauts
K – Don Sweet, Montreal Alouettes

1978 Western All-Stars

Offence
QB – Tom Wilkinson, Edmonton Eskimos
RB – James Sykes, Calgary Stampeders
RB – Mike Strickland, Saskatchewan Roughriders
SB – Tom Scott, Edmonton Eskimos
TE – Willie Armstead, Calgary Stampeders
WR – Joe Poplawski, Winnipeg Blue Bombers
WR – Mike Holmes, Winnipeg Blue Bombers
C – Al Wilson, BC Lions
OG – Harold Holton, Calgary Stampeders
OG – Bill Stevenson, Edmonton Eskimos
OT – Lloyd Fairbanks, Calgary Stampeders
OT – Butch Norman, Winnipeg Blue Bombers

Defence
DT – Dave Fennell, Edmonton Eskimos
DT – John Helton, Calgary Stampeders
DE – Ron Estay, Edmonton Eskimos
DE – Reggie Lewis, Calgary Stampeders
LB – Danny Kepley, Edmonton Eskimos
LB – Tom Towns, Edmonton Eskimos
LB – Glen Jackson, BC Lions
DB – Joe Hollimon, Edmonton Eskimos
DB – Terry Irvin, Calgary Stampeders
DB – Ed Jones, Edmonton Eskimos
DB – Gregg Butler, Edmonton Eskimos
DB – Al Burleson, Calgary Stampeders

Special teams
P – Hank Ilesic, Edmonton Eskimos
K – Dave Cutler, Edmonton Eskimos

1978 CFL Awards
CFL's Most Outstanding Player Award – Tony Gabriel (TE), Ottawa Rough Riders
CFL's Most Outstanding Canadian Award – Tony Gabriel (TE), Ottawa Rough Riders
CFL's Most Outstanding Defensive Player Award – Dave "Dr. Death" Fennell (DT), Edmonton Eskimos
CFL's Most Outstanding Offensive Lineman Award – Jim Coode (OT), Ottawa Rough Riders
CFL's Most Outstanding Rookie Award – Joe Poplawski (WR), Winnipeg Blue Bombers
CFLPA's Outstanding Community Service Award – Peter Muller (TE), Toronto Argonauts
CFL's Coach of the Year – Jack Gotta, Calgary Stampeders

References 

CFL
Canadian Football League seasons